The Censorate was a high-level supervisory agency in Imperial China, first established during the Qin dynasty (221–207 BC).

The Censorate was a highly effective agency during the Mongol-led Yuan dynasty (1271–1368). During the Ming dynasty (1368–1644), the Censorate was a branch of the centralized bureaucracy, paralleling the Six Ministries and the five Chief Military Commissions, and was directly responsible to the emperor.  The investigating censors were "the eyes and ears" of the emperor and checked administrators at each level to prevent corruption and malfeasance, a common feature of that period. Popular stories told of righteous censors revealing corruption as well as censors who accepted bribes. Generally speaking, they were feared and disliked, and had to move around constantly to perform their duties.

Internal structure 
The Censorate was divided into three branches.
 The Palace Branch was responsible for monitoring the behavior of officials during audiences. It was staffed by in-palace enquiry censors.
 The Admonishment Branch was responsible for monitoring the behavior of the emperor, to ensure that he did not make mistakes and remind him of his duties. It was staffed by enquiry censors.
 The Detection Branch was responsible for monitoring the behavior of local officials. Monitor censors would tour the country in circuits to ensure the proper discharge of the functions of government and good performance of local officials.

Vietnam 

During the Nguyễn dynasty a representative from the censorate served as a member of a government commission formed to create inscriptions for the 1 mạch cash coins.

See also 

 Central Commission for Discipline Inspection of the Chinese Communist Party
 Control Yuan (Republic of China)
 National Supervisory Commission (People's Republic of China)
 Three Departments and Six Ministries (Imperial China)
 Department of Chancellery
 Ministry of Personnel
 Ministry of Justice (imperial China)

References

Citations

Sources 

 
 
 
 

Government of Imperial China
Government of the Ming dynasty
Government audit